G. Roger Denson (born 1956) is an American journalist, cultural and art critic, theoretician, novelist, and curator. He is a regular contributor to The Huffington Post, his writings have also appeared in such international publications as Art in America, Parkett, Artscribe, Flash Art, Cultural Politics, Bijutsu Techo, Kunstlerhaus Bethanien, Artbyte, Art Experience, Arts Magazine, Contemporanea, Tema Celeste, M/E/A/N/I/N/G, Trans>Arts, Culture, Media, and Journal of Contemporary Art.  

He has published criticism and commentary on such international artists as Terrence Malick, Kathryn Bigelow, Hiroshi Sugimoto, Sigmar Polke, Andres Serrano, Yvonne Rainer, Carrie Mae Weems, Catherine Opie, Sarah Charlesworth, Cindy Sherman, Jack Smith, Philip Taaffe, Pat Steir, Shirin Neshat, Marilyn Minter, Renée Green, John Miller, Lorna Simpson, Robert Longo, Ashley Bickerton, Hunter Reynolds, Kathe Burkhart, Tishan Hsu, Liz Larner, Gilbert and George, Barbara Ess, Robert Ryman, Dan Flavin, General Idea, Lydia Dona, Maura Sheehan, Jimmy De Sana, Dan Graham and Richard Artschwager, Wael Shawky, Shazia Sikander, Jim Shaw (artist), Louise Bourgeois, Robert Gober, Vasudeo S. Gaitonde, Gego, Nasreen Mohamedi, Kurt Hentschläger, Claudia Hart, and Susan Silas.

Denson has written on the criticism of Thomas McEvilley (with republished essays by McEvilley) in Capacity: History, the World, and the Self in Contemporary Art and Criticism, currently issued by Routledge, (originally Gordon & Breach).  Denson's monographs and catalogues include Dennis Oppenheim, (Fundacao De Serralves, Portugal); Hunter Reynolds: Memento Mori, Memoriter, (Trinitatiskirche, Cologne); Michael Young: Predella of Difference, (Blum Helman, New York).  And in the book by Robert Morris (artist), Continuous Project Altered Daily: The Writings of Robert Morris (October Books, MIT Press), Denson has contributed to the chapter, “Robert Morris Replies to Roger Denson (Or Is That a Mouse in My Paragon?)”.

Toward a nomadic criticism
In the late 1980s and early 1990s, Denson reached beyond conventional art criticism to establish a reputation as a nomadic ideologist.  As such, he developed an approach toward the criticism of art that matches the concerns of his subjects.  He does this by entering into the ideological models presented to the viewer by an artist rather than carrying with him some pre-established criteria that is projected onto all art.  Among the philosophical issues Denson addresses are those of pragmatism, historicism, cultural relativism, and mythopoetics, all of which are ideologically suited to dismantling the need for a master narrative or identity.  In so doing, he effectively dismantles cultural, national, racial, sexual, and gender biases in the critique of art and culture.

About Denson's commentary in Capacity, the art critic Michelle C. Cone wrote in the College Art Association's Art Journal that "the unusual antiphonal structure of the book proves to be an interesting as well as novel way to reframe and 'add value' to previously published material. G. Roger Denson, a curator and critic who is McEvilley's commentator throughout the book, perceptively analyzes the relativist attitude. Denson's observations provide a particular edge to McEvilley's critique of Clement Greenberg's determinist interpretation of painting's evolution toward flatness. Exposing Greenberg's myopia toward ancient and non-Western cultures, he points out that 'In extending Greenberg's historicism and avant-garde logically in space and time, McEvilley takes us to societies that were the originators--the true avant-garde--of flat painting."

Among Denson's most influential essays count "Going Back to Start, Perpetually: Playing the Nomadic Game in the Critical Reception of Art," which first appeared in Parkett issue #40/41, 1994, (in English and German) and was republished (in Spanish) in El reverso de la diferencia, Caracas, 2000.  It is here that Denson states, "To a great degree the nomad is to late twentieth-century intellectuals what the noble savage was to Enlightenment writers like John Dryden, Jean-Jacques Rousseau, Voltaire, and François-René de Chateaubriand.  I write this not to debunk the nomadic model in postmodern culture, but to stress how some intellectuals (I think especially of Gilles Deleuze and Félix Guattari) have romanticized a pragmatic, decentered, migrant existence as a dissident response to global institutions and technologies that are becoming increasingly centralized and fortified at their boundaries." This is despite, as Denson argues, there being "a host of global conditions in the world that are adversarial to the spread of nomadic methods of conceptualization, judgment, and discourse, whether in reference to the shifting significations that come with cross-cultural or multicultural convergence, or the multiplicity of conceptual models that breed with today's radical skepticism, deconstructive suspension and deferral of belief, and provisional and pragmatic views of discourse and political action.  The nomadic tendency, then, is the intellectual's game, though it is also at work in the mainstreams of postindustrial nations ... the willed and pragmatic response to diversity and displacement that leads to prosperous and protean results."  In the end, Denson concludes, "No doubt a kind of conceptual and cultural nomadism has been mediated for centralized and static populations through journalism, network and cable television, cinema, the internet, and virtual reality.  From here one can distinguish what we mean anthropologically by "nomadic"—from our metaphorical usage of it critically and theoretically to describe the shiftings and migrations occurring in a global civilization. ...Paradoxically, this logic proceeds to make the couch potato or armchair traveller a potentially formidable player of nomadism."

Expanding on this notion a year later in Migrations of the Real and the Ideal: Exploring a Nomadic Criticism, (published in the premiere issue of Trans>Arts, Culture, Media), Denson writes: "Because there are so many models of reality and identity existing simultaneously, because there are so many societies and cultures converging in a global community, because discourse is being negotiated among them, and because we are recognizing multiple histories of the world, we require a critical attitude that rides with the shifts in civilization's discourse.  The best of today's critics are ready to visit the models of any given community—ideological, spiritual, political, economic, technological, scientific, aesthetic—at any given time without obstructing communication and insinuating personal models on them.  This does not mean that we must have expertise in those models or even accept them personally, but we must be ready to defer and then adapt all personal criteria responsively in acknowledgement of the world's diversity. ...When two or more ideas conflict, the temptation often is to reconcile them.  Nomadic criticism doesn’t require this.  We needn’t reconcile an idea to any other, including the model of nomadism.  We can just move among them, using them when we need to, putting them on hold when we don’t.  The nomadic ideal also doesn’t position two or more models in opposition.  We think only of two or more ideas as being opposed if we think we hold a more comprehensive, singular, or foundational truth; nomadism holds that there are only shifting and contingent models that are as temporally relative as the condition among individuals, communities, and environments that produce them."

In 1996, Denson gives example of the kind of nomadic criticism he has been referring to.  In Capacity: History, the World, and the Self in Contemporary Art and Criticism, Denson writes of the art critic Thomas McEvilley. "Through his reference to various models around the world, readers get an idea of how much more liberating it is to capaciously represent and experience the world's heterogeneity. ...Globalism and diversity, as McEvilley represents them, have come to replace the esteem of universality. Globalism, in contrast to universalism, compels cooperation and exchange from multiple sources (cultures and geographies) without posing any one as primary; it is the composition or network potentially encompassing all diversity without imposing a unity or other singular principle on it."

Most recently, Denson drew considerable attention to the application of nomadic criteria in art history when, in Huffington Post, he published "Colonizing Abstraction: MoMA’s Inventing Abstraction Show Denies Its Ancient Global Origins". In reviewing the survey of significant early 20th-century abstraction at The Museum of Modern Art in New York from December 23, 2012, to April 15, 2013, most of it by European and American painters, Denson claimed that by calling the show "Inventing Abstraction, 1910-1925", the curators at MoMA appear "unwilling to admit that visual abstraction existed outside of Europe, let alone that it can be found on all six habitable continents for at least tens of thousands of years." Denson went on to propose, "Abstraction is the basic principle underpinning the production of all art—however literal and pictorial, formalist and conceptual. Its “invention” is now thought to have occurred at least over fifty-thousand years ago, as it can be said to have originated spontaneously as much in Africa as in Asia as in Australia as in America as in Europe."  Responding to Denson's critique, the Blouin Artinfo critic, Ben Davis, in his review of the show, wrote that Denson had written a "savage polemic" in accusing "curators Leah Dickerman and Masha Chlenova of promulgating a Eurocentric vision by claiming that these artists 'invented abstraction.' What about Japanese 'flung ink' painting, Denson asks? What about the various forms of African carving and Oceanic art that the modernists themselves claimed to be influenced by? What about Islamic art, with its prohibition on representation altogether?"

Denson exemplifies this nomadic relativism when examining the intersection of art and politics in such publications as Foreign Affairs: Conflicts in the Global Village—Central America, Middle East, South Africa, (with Noam Chomsky, Edward Said, Geno Rodriguez, and Eqbal Ahmed), and Occupation and Resistance, about the art and artists reflecting on and participating in the Palestinian First Intifada.

The authoring of authority
Underpinning Denson's nomadic approach to art and criticism and tangential to his relativism is his view on the authority implicit in all authorship. “Authoring Authority in the Rhetoric of Art Criticism" is an essay Denson contributed to a collection of essays by contemporary art critics centered around the issue of Cultural Permissions.  In this essay Denson elaborates on the authority granted authors in contemporary society despite the appearance (really a very modern assumption) that authorship itself has such authority implicit within it when in reality it does not.  Denson finds the evidence for the evolution of our widespread misperception of an author's authority in the etymology of our language.  “Thought, in its very formation, reinforces its own power of persuasion in the languages it generates and, in turn, is generated by. The Latin etymologies of author, (auctor: originator, promoter) and authority (autorititat: opinion, decision)" indicate that, although the Bronze and Iron Age monarchal and priestly authors of official, self-aggrandizing narratives decreed writing to possess an historically absolute authority, this was not the belief system conveyed by the architects of written language.

Eytymology, Denson holds, provides evidence that writing was conceived as, if not arbitrary narratives, then certainly as no more than narratives relative to an author's life conditions. It was only after the invention of movable type and the mass circulation of texts saturated cultural consciousness that the now printed and ubiquitously distributed opinion of an author became illusionistically equated with its authority. "He whose opinion becomes popularly received must hold autonomy of will" became a popular faith coursing through secular and religious affairs.  "Thus evolves the will to power that Nietzsche saw driving all human behavior," Denson writes. "When entering public discourse, the will to power, the self (the auto, the author) reifies itself over time and with material and linguistic (some might say metaphysical) persuasions, establishes itself as a worldly authority, an authority of opinion that is shared or widely consented to.  For the rhetoric of a skilled author can summon a single, common mind from among the masses, especially those prone to give up their own points of view for a slogan or method.”

Denson goes on to demonstrate that the autonomy of the will is not itself sanctioned by a public threatened by overt displays of power.  Hence in democratic states the deferential nature of authorship is the author's buffer with the public, even as it sedates the reader's skepticism in the author.  The effect is the authority conferred on authors by the public is largely conferred on those who successfully appeal to prior authorities, institutions, and ideas already enjoying some measure of support at least by the informed, reading public.  Constructed in opposition to the ancient and long-running bias of logocentrism, the privileging of the spoken word over writing presumed to be the foundation for authentic ideas, reason, and even reality, Denson's authority of authorship is a model of the shifting but interlinking appeals made by an author to receive the reader's consent.  Such appeals by an author imply the authority of a text is often conferred more in deferring to prior models, institutions, and authorities, than to any force of reason or individual vision textually conveyed.

The obvious debts to and departures from the critiques of logocentrism by Ludwig Klages and the Deconstruction of Jacques Derrida are immediately evident.  But Denson also at once aligns with and disputes Roland Barthes' 1967 essay, The Death of the Author, which attributes the aura, politics, ethnicity, faith, and nationality of the author as having undue influence in the reception of a text. Similarly, Denson both concurs with and removes himself from Edward Said’s 1983 critique, The World, the Text, and the Critic, when he sites the "anterior restraints" of past writers as that which both anchors an author's authority in history and prompts the author's celebrity at least in contemporary society.  But such anterior restraints, Denson points out, are also what prevent authors from seeing and reporting on the deeper and unmediated significance of events in the larger context of human affairs, especially if such affairs are introduced in new ways and fashions.  It is in Denson's own borrowing from and simultaneous arguing with perceived authorities that he came to see that deference to prior citations and expertise is not only unavoidable, it is something imposed on the writer by the very conditions of textuality and discourse.  Entirely social, writing must be derived from reading, and in public expressions, especially those of criticism and theory, a writer's contribution has as much to do with channeling authors come and gone as it does in making unique contributions.

In this arena, the measure of consensus with which an author is greeted is in large part contingent on the degree to which the writer appeals to recognized authorities and ideas—those fashionable or relevant to the public—more than the merit of the idea itself.  This isn't to say that Denson doesn't see creativity, and even glimmers of originality, everywhere in the history of authorship. Yet, however revolutionary a text is touted to be, Denson believes it must be anchored, however discreetly (and often covertly), to prior authorities, institutions, customs, even whims and fashions, otherwise its individualist insights will likely go unappreciated.  Without appealing to political, religious, societal, economic, ethnic, or engendered identities—the appeals Klages, Derrida, Barthes, and Said critique—an author will be lost to posterity.  In the new global arena of texts, the authors capable of making the greatest mark on civilization, Denson holds, are those conversant with the greatest array of authorities and vaunted ideas of the past, while being able to make the authority of the past appear new and relevant to the largest targeted public.  It is up to the reading public to learn to be aware of, and whenever possible to discern, which anterior traditions, institutions, ideologies and esteemed figures an author defers to buttress her own authority before accepting that author as authoritative.

Early work
Before becoming a cultural critic, Denson helped to launch the careers of a number of young artists as well as to exhibit the work of several who were already internationally acclaimed.  In the 1970s and 1980s, as a curator of painting, sculpture, photography, performance, dance, film, and video, he worked with such artists as Allan Kaprow, Vito Acconci, Chris Burden, Suzanne Lacy, Joan Jonas, Steve Paxton and Dancers, Trisha Brown and Dancers, Eric Fischl, Shigeko Kubota, Yvonne Rainer, Laurie Anderson, Dara Birnbaum, Gary Hill, Hollis Frampton, Paul Sharits, Kathryn Bigelow, Marina Abramović, Douglas Dunn and Dancers, Lew Thomas, Gretchen Faust, Leon Golub, Francesco Clemente, Sandro Chia, Wolfgang Staehle, Scott B and Beth B, Polly Apfelbaum, among numerous others.  Denson curated primarily at Hallwalls, Buffalo, New York, but later was a guest curator with the Albright-Knox Art Gallery; A-Space, Toronto; The New Museum of Contemporary Art; The Alternative Museum; Abington Art Center, Philadelphia; and various New York commercial galleries.  Perhaps the exhibition for which he is best known as a curator is Poetic Injury: The Surrealist Legacy in Postmodern Photography, held at The Alternative Museum, with a catalogue and essays by Denson and Suzaan Boettger, and a preface by Rosalind Krauss.

Recent work
In 2004, Denson co-wrote and edited the performance script for Don’t Trust Anyone Over Thirty: Entertainment by Dan Graham and Tony Oursler, performed at Art Basel Miami Beach; Thyssen-Bornemisza Museum, Vienna; and The Walker Art Center, Minneapolis, 2004–05.  A film montage of the performance made by Tony Oursler was installed at the Whitney Biennial 2006, Whitney Museum of Art in New York.

From 2005 to 2008, Denson developed and taught MFA courses in art criticism and writing at New York's School of Visual Arts. He claimed on the SVA website that his courses were especially designed to introduce students to the diverse art, thought, and polity reflective of global history and contemporary events. Such exposure to the world at large should precede specialized study of aesthetic, social, and political theories, he holds, so that each individual is equipped with the intellectual and emotional counterweights required to keep from being unduly seduced by attractive, but myopic world views and paradigms.

In 2010, Denson personified nomadic diversity in his novel, Voice of Force (published with Oracle Press) not only in his characters, but by relinquishing the author's godlike perspective and voice and replacing it with narration by multiple voices loudly expressing contrasting points of view.

In 2017, the monograph SPLENDID VOIDS. The immersive works of Kurt Hentschläger was published. Denson contributed an essay titled The Splendid Phenomenology of Hentschlägerian Voids. Together with curator and editor Isabelle Meiffert, he's distributing an in-depth elucidation of Hentschläger's phenomenological works.

References

1956 births
Living people
American art critics
American male non-fiction writers